Kohtla-Järve Ice Hall is an ice arena in Kohtla-Järve, Estonia.

The hall was opened in 1986. The last major reconstructions were made in 1997.

The hall's capacity is 2000.

The hall has an ice arena with dimensions of 30 x 60 m.

The hall is used by two ice hockey clubs: Kohtla-Järve Viru Sputnik and Kohtla-Järve Everest.

References

Indoor arenas in Estonia
Kohtla-Järve
Indoor ice hockey venues in Estonia